may refer to:

People
Sonoko Chiba (千葉 園子, born 1993), Japanese football player
, Japanese singer-songwriter and actress
Sonoko Kato (加藤 園子, born 1976), Japanese professional wrestler
Sonoko Kawai (河合 その子, born 1965), former Japanese singer
, Japanese novelist
Sonoko Sakai, Japanese American cooking teacher and food writer

Music
Sonoko (album), by Sonoko Kawai

Fictional characters
Sonoko Sakanoue, a character in the video game Yandere Simulator
, a character from the Japanese manga Case Closed
Nogi Sonoko, a character from Yuki Yuna is a Hero
Sonoko, Belgian-Japanese singer on Crammed Discs

Japanese feminine given names